The commune of Muruta is a commune of Kayanza Province in northern Burundi. The capital lies at Muruta.It is one of the nine communes making Kayanza Province.

References

Communes of Burundi
Kayanza Province